Streptomyces iakyrus is a bacterium species from the genus of Streptomyces which has been isolated from soil Streptomyces iakyrus produces actinomycin G2, actinomycin G3, actinomycin G4, actinomycin G5, actinomycin G6, iakirine I, iakirine II and  iakirine III.

See also 
 List of Streptomyces species

References

Further reading

External links
Type strain of Streptomyces iakyrus at BacDive -  the Bacterial Diversity Metadatabase

iakyrus
Bacteria described in 1962